The Jess Norman Post 166 American Legion Hut is a historic clubhouse at 222 South First Street in Augusta, Arkansas.  It is a single-story rectangular log structure, with a gable roof and a stone chimney.  It is fashioned out of cypress logs joined by square notches, and rests on piers of stone and wood.  It was built in 1934 with funding from the Civil Works Administration for the local American Legion chapter, and is architecturally unique in the city.  It is still used for its original purpose.

The building was listed on the National Register of Historic Places in 2001.

See also
National Register of Historic Places listings in Woodruff County, Arkansas

References

External links
Encyclopedia of Arkansas History & Culture entry

Clubhouses on the National Register of Historic Places in Arkansas
American Legion buildings
National Register of Historic Places in Woodruff County, Arkansas
1934 establishments in Arkansas
Cultural infrastructure completed in 1934
Log buildings and structures on the National Register of Historic Places in Arkansas
Civil Works Administration
New Deal in Arkansas
Augusta, Arkansas